Nasrani may refer to:
 Nasrani (Arabic term for Christian) derived from Hebrew word Netzer or the Aramaic Nasraya
 Nasrani (film), a 2007 Malayalam movie starring Mammootty
 Saint Thomas Christians or Nasrani, an ancient community of Christians from Kerala, India

See also
 Ras Nasrani, a bay at Sharm El Sheikh